Thierry Lang (born 1956) is a Swiss composer and jazz pianist.

In 2006, Lang gave a concert in his native village of Romont along with bassist Heiri Kanzig and violinist Didier Lockwood.

He teaches piano and composition at the University of Lausanne and University of Bern in Switzerland. He has recorded jazz music discs with Blue Note Records, among others. In 2008 Lang was awarded a Doctor Honoris Causa from the European University.

Selected discography
Celebration (2020)
Serenity (2014)
Lyoba Revisited (2010)

References

External links
Official website
University of Berne profile

1956 births
Living people
Swiss composers
Swiss male composers
Swiss jazz pianists
People from the canton of Fribourg
Academic staff of the University of Lausanne
Academic staff of the University of Bern
Male pianists
21st-century pianists
21st-century male musicians
Male jazz musicians
ACT Music artists
Blue Note Records artists